Antia may refer to:

 Antia gens, a Roman gens
 Antía, a female given name
 Noshir H. Antia, an Indian plastic surgeon

See also 
 Antius (disambiguation)